Ophthalamia was a Swedish black metal band that formed in 1989.

History

Ophthalamia was formed in 1989 by singer All and guitarist IT, both also active in the musical groups Abruptum and Vondur. The band named themselves Ophthalamia after a fantasy-world created by IT. He created and named the geography, the land's creatures and a language for Ophthalamians. The Goddess of this world is a demon woman called Elishia. Almost all songs written by the band are connected in some way to this fantasy-world, until their last album, which was inspired by Macbeth.

The vocals were initially handled by All, but he was replaced by Shadow (Jon Nödtveidt) on A Journey In Darkness. Shadow, in his turn, was replaced by Legion for the Via Dolorosa album. Legion left the band for the infamous Marduk in 1995 and was replaced by All again. Winter played drums on the first two albums, but left right after Via Dolorosa was recorded. He was replaced by Bone. Guitarist Mourning was replaced by former bassist Night, who picked up the guitars for the Via Dolorosa album and is now the second guitarist. Mist replaced him on bass. Axa (Alexandra Balogh) who contributed as a piano session player also composed the last track of Dissection's album Storm Of The Light's Bane.

Line-up
 IT (Tony Särkkä) - guitar, vocals (deceased 08/02/2017)
 Night (Emil Nödtveidt) - guitar
 Bone (Ole Öhman) - drums, percussion
 All (Jim Berger) - lead vocals
 Mist (Mikael Schelin) - bass

Former members
 Shadow (Jon Nödtveidt) - vocals (deceased 16/08/2006)
 Legion (Erik Hagstedt) - vocals
 Winter (Benny Larsson) - drums
 Mourning (Robert Ivarsson) - bass

Session members
 Axa - Piano, backing vocals

Discography
 1994 - A Journey in Darkness
 1995 - Via Dolorosa
 1997 - To Elishia (compilation)
 1998 - A Long Journey (re-recording of A Journey in Darkness)
 1998 - Dominion
 2019 - II Elishia II

External links
 Official homepage

Musical groups established in 1989
Swedish black metal musical groups